Winter hazel is a common name for several plants and may refer to:

 Corylopsis
 Corylopsis pauciflora, native to Taiwan and Japan
 Distylium